Heinrich Wolfgang Ludwig Dohrn (16 June 1838, Braunschweig – 1 October 1913, Florence) was a German zoologist, entomologist and malacologist.

Heinrich Dohrn’s family was from Pomerania (now in Poland). His father was the entomologist Carl August Dohrn (1806–1892) and his brother Anton Dohrn (1840–1909), founder of the short-lived marine station at Messina and then Stazione Zoologica. He studied at  Stettin getting his diploma 1858. He collected natural history specimens in Príncipe in 1865. He was the founder of  the museum at Stettin to hold the collections of the naturalists of the town, members of the Stettin Entomological Society but this soon became an art museum. He opened the doors of the museum to the public in 1913. He engaged in 1904, Adolf Furtwängler (1853–1907), professor of Archaeology at the University of Munich to reconstruct Greek marbles found as fragments.

References

Bo Beolens and Michael Watkins (2003). Whose Bird ? Common Bird Names and the People They Commemorate. Yale University Press (New Haven and London) : 400 p.
M. Lopuch (2004). Hellenic Stettin, Biuletyn Historii Sztuki, 66 (1-2) : 127-144 (ISSN 0006-3967).

External links 
 photos of Heinrich Wolfgang Ludwig Dohrn.

1838 births
1913 deaths
German entomologists
German malacologists
People from the Duchy of Brunswick
Scientists from Braunschweig